Mimolaia is a genus of longhorn beetles of the subfamily Lamiinae.

 Mimolaia acaiuba Galileo & Martins, 1998
 Mimolaia annulata Galileo & Martins, 2010
 Mimolaia buckleyi (Bates, 1885)
 Mimolaia calopterona (Bates, 1885)
 Mimolaia cleroides (Bates, 1866)
 Mimolaia diversicornis Galileo & Martins, 2010
 Mimolaia hua Galileo & Martins, 1991
 Mimolaia lata Galileo & Martins, 1991
 Mimolaia peruana Galileo & Martins, 1991
 Mimolaia pichincha Galileo & Martins, 1992
 Mimolaia tachira Galileo & Martins, 1992
 Mimolaia variicornis Belon, 1903

References

Calliini